The 2010 U.S. Figure Skating Championships took place between January 14 and 24 at the Spokane Veterans Memorial Arena in Spokane, Washington with AT&T as the title sponsor. Skaters competed in four disciplines – men's singles, ladies' singles, pair skating, and ice dancing – across three levels: senior, junior, and novice. Medals were awarded in four colors: gold (first), silver (second), bronze (third), and pewter (fourth).

The Olympics were to begin 18 days after the end of the U.S. Championships. The senior-level Championship events were therefore spread out over two weekends to allow the skaters approximately four weeks between the end of their event and the start of the corresponding Olympic competition.

The event was among the criteria used to select the U.S. teams for the 2010 Winter Olympics, 2010 World Championships, 2010 Four Continents Championships, and 2010 World Junior Championships.

The senior compulsory dance was the Golden Waltz.

Olympic team selection
The results of the 2010 U.S. Championships were among the criteria used to determine the 2010 Olympic team. The competitions used in the selection process were, in order of priority:
 2010 U.S. Championships
 2009–10 Grand Prix Final
 2009 World Championships
 2009 Four Continents Championships
 2009 World Junior Championships
 2009–10 Junior Grand Prix Final

The United States had qualified 3 Olympic spots in men's singles and ice dancing and 2 Olympic spots in ladies singles and pair skating. The entrants are nominated by U.S. Figure Skating and must be confirmed by the United States Olympic Committee.

The nominees in each discipline were announced following the completion of that discipline's competition. The pairs entrants were nominated on January 16, the men on January 17, and the ladies and ice dancers on January 23.

Qualification
Qualification for the U.S. Championships began at one of nine regional competitions: New England, North Atlantic, South Atlantic, Upper Great Lakes, Eastern Great Lakes, Southwestern, Northwest Pacific, Central Pacific, and Southwest Pacific. The top four finishers in each regional competition advanced to one of three sectional competitions: Eastern, Midwestern, and Pacific Coast. Skaters who placed in the top four at the sectional competitions advanced to the U.S. Championships.

Byes to the competition were given to skaters who had won medals at the 2006 Winter Olympics or the 2009 World Figure Skating Championships; to the top five finishers in each senior-level discipline at the 2009 U.S. Figure Skating Championships; to any skaters who qualified for the 2009–10 Junior or Senior Grand Prix Final in the discipline in which they qualified; and to any skater who was assigned to an international event that occurred at the same time as their sectional championship.

Byes
The following skaters have been given byes to the 2010 U.S. Championships and did not have to compete at regionals or sectionals.

Ice dancers Morgan Matthews / Leif Gislason would have received a bye due to their 5th-place finish. However, the team dissolved following the 2008–09 season.

Senior results

Men

Ladies

Pairs

Ice dancing

Junior results

Men

Ladies

Pairs

Ice dancing

Novice results

Men

Ladies

Pairs

Ice dancing

International team selections

Winter Olympic
The nominations to the Olympic team were announced as follows:

World Championships
The World Championships team was announced as follows:

Four Continents Championships
The Four Continents Championships team was announced as follows:

World Junior Championships
The World Junior Championships team was announced as follows:

References

External links
 2010 United States Figure Skating Championships results
 
 Official site
 

2010
Sports in Spokane, Washington
2010 in figure skating
2010 in American sports
January 2010 sports events in the United States